"This Is It" is a song by the American rock band Staind. It served as the fourth and final single from the band's sixth studio album The Illusion of Progress. The song was released on May 4, 2009. It is featured on the soundtrack for the 2009 film Transformers: Revenge of the Fallen.

Track listing

Charts

References

2009 singles
2008 songs
Staind songs
Roadrunner Records singles
Atlantic Records singles
Songs written by Aaron Lewis
Songs written by Mike Mushok
Song recordings produced by Johnny K